James Robert Starr (June 2, 1933 – August 3, 1998) was an American sportscaster.

Biography
Born in Kansas City, Missouri and raised by adoptive parents in Oklahoma, Starr attended Coffeyville Junior College and then the University of Kansas, where he played football and baseball. Following a stint in the U.S. Army, Starr began his broadcasting career calling high school and college basketball in Illinois. Starr's first TV job was as a sports anchor on WMBD-TV in Peoria, Illinois, where he also broadcast basketball games for Bradley University. In 1966, Starr was hired by WBZ radio in Boston to call Boston Patriots and Boston College Eagles football games. In 1971 Starr left Boston to begin work as Sports Director for KTVU television in Oakland, California.

In 1972, Starr moved to St. Louis to work for KMOX radio and call games for the St. Louis Cardinals and Missouri Tigers football teams and the St. Louis Cardinals baseball team. In September 1975, Starr broadcast a Cardinals baseball game on a Friday night in New York, flew to Minnesota for a football Cardinals exhibition game on a Saturday evening, returned to New York for a baseball game the following afternoon, and then flew to Birmingham, AL to call the Missouri Tigers 20-7 upset of Alabama on a Monday night. "Really, I don't mind that sort of schedule at all. It's sometimes irritating, or frustrating when connections are tight and the weather is bad."

Starr would spend most of his career in Anaheim, CA, where he called Los Angeles Rams football and California Angels baseball from 1980 to 1989.  During his years in St. Louis and Anaheim, Starr also broadcast several football bowl games.

In 1990, Starr returned to Boston to replace Ken Coleman on Red Sox radio. Starr would spend three years with the Red Sox before returning to call Rams and Angels games. Steve Physioc would replace Starr on Rams radio network in 1994 and Starr would retire from Angels radio network in 1997.  Starr died at his home in Orange, California, August 3, 1998 of respiratory failure and pulmonary fibrosis.

References

1933 births
1998 deaths
American Football League announcers
American sports announcers
Boston College Eagles football announcers
Boston Patriots announcers
Boston Red Sox announcers
California Angels announcers
College basketball announcers in the United States
College football announcers
High school basketball announcers in the United States
High school football announcers in the United States
Los Angeles Rams announcers
Major League Baseball broadcasters
Missouri Tigers football announcers
National Football League announcers
Sportspeople from Kansas City, Missouri
Sportspeople from Orange County, California
Sports in Boston
St. Louis Blues announcers
St. Louis Cardinals announcers
St. Louis Cardinals (football) announcers
United States Army personnel
University of Kansas alumni
Coffeyville Community College alumni